Meşəli (until 1998, known as Xarxaput) is a village in the municipality of Aşağı Ağcakənd in the Goranboy District of Azerbaijan. The village had an Armenian majority before the First Nagorno-Karabakh War and Operation Ring.

References 

Populated places in Goranboy District